Terror Bay is an Arctic waterway in the Kitikmeot Region, Nunavut, Canada. It is located in the south western side of King William Island. The entrance to the bay is marked by Fitzjames Island on the west and Irving Islands to the east. The Bay opens to Queen Maud Gulf.

The bay was one of a series of landmarks along the waters explored by Franklin's lost expedition between 1845 and 1848. The bay has the same name as HMS Terror, one of the two ships of the expedition. The ships entered Baffin Bay in 1845 on their quest to find a Northwest Passage, and were abandoned sometime in 1848. Terror Bay was officially named by the Geographical Names Board of Canada in 1910. Inuit oral history provided clues about the ships' demise, but the precise locations of the wrecks were not known for over 160 years as these stories were ignored.

In 2016, Arctic Research Foundation researchers on board the Martin Bergmann announced that they had found the wreck of HMS Terror in Terror Bay. They had been led there by a tip from Inuk crewman Sammy Kogvik, from Gjoa Haven, who reported seeing a mast protruding from the ice in Terror Bay during a hunting trip in 2010.  The wreck of the other ship of the lost expedition, HMS Erebus, had previously been found in 2014.

References

Bays of Kitikmeot Region
Franklin's lost expedition
History of Nunavut
Maritime history of Canada